The Tanimbar eclectus, or Riedel's eclectus (Eclectus riedeli) is a parrot species which is native to the Tanimbar Islands. It is smaller than the Moluccan eclectus. The male has a more bluish tinge to its green cheeks and neck, and its tail is edged with a broad band of yellow. The female has an all red plumage, except for royal blue primaries, yellow under-tail coverts and a broad band of yellow to edge the tail,.

Aviculture
Rare in captivity, the Tanimbar eclectus can be found in zoos and bird parks in Spain and Germany.

References

Eclectus
Birds of Indonesia
Birds of the Tanimbar Islands
Birds described in 1882